Richard Lawson (born 1982/1983) is an American writer and critic. He rose to prominence as an entertainment writer for Gawker and was named chief critic for Vanity Fair in 2018. Lawson's debut YA novel, All We Can Do Is Wait, was released in February 2018.

Career 
Lawson began his writing career at Gawker in 2007. Initially hired onto Gawker's ad sales team, Lawson secretly began participating in Gawker's active comments section under the handle LolCait, where his writing gained the attention of the editorial staff. After revealing his identity, he began providing editorial content for the site, first by selecting the week's best comments, and eventually becoming a full-time editor. Lawson gained notice for his television recaps for shows such as The Real Housewives of New York City. His posts were the most popular on the site, where they garnered 2.4 million viewers each month. He left in July 2009 to work at TV.com for five months, before returning to Gawker. Lawson left the site for the second time in late 2011 to work for The Atlantic Wire as a senior entertainment and culture writer.

In November 2013, Lawson left The Atlantic Wire to work as the Hollywood columnist at Vanity Fair. Four months later, he was hired as the magazine's TV and film critic. In March 2018, he became Vanity Fair's chief critic.

Lawson's debut novel, All We Can Do Is Wait, was released on February 6, 2018 under Razorbill. The book is a YA novel that centers on a group of teenagers in the waiting room of a hospital after a bridge collapse. All We Can Do Is Wait received a starred review from Publishers Weekly.

Preferences

Favorites 
When asked to rank the best films of the 2010 decade, Lawson named: 

1. Mad Max: Fury Road (USA, 2015)
2. Phantom Thread (USA, 2018)
3. Dawson City: Frozen Time (USA, 2016)
4. Melancholia (Denmark, 2011)
5. Parasite (South Korea, 2019)
6. Get Out (USA, 2017)
7. Eden (France, 2014)
8. Force Majeure (Sweden, 2014)
9. Weekend (UK, 2011)
10. Princess Cyd (USA, 2017)

Best of the Year 
Since becoming a film critic for Vanity Fair, Lawson has marked these films as the best of the year.
 2013: Nebraska
 2014: Love is Strange
 2015: Mad Max: Fury Road
 2016: The Meddler 
 2017: BPM (Beats per Minute)
 2018: Roma
 2019: Parasite
 2020: The Nest
 2021: The Worst Person in the World
 2022: Tár

Personal life 
Lawson was raised in the Brighton neighborhood of Boston, and attended Boston Latin School and Boston College, before moving to New York City.

Lawson wrote an article that went viral about the personal significance of openly gay Olympic figure skater Adam Rippon during the 2018 Winter Olympics.

References

External links 
Richard Lawson on Vanity Fair

Year of birth missing (living people)
1980s births
21st-century American male writers
21st-century American non-fiction writers
21st-century American novelists
American male bloggers
American bloggers
American film critics
National Society of Film Critics Members
American online publication editors
American television critics
American young adult novelists
The Atlantic (magazine) people
Boston College alumni
Boston Latin School alumni
Entertainment journalists
American gay writers
Gawker Media
LGBT people from Massachusetts
Living people
Novelists from Massachusetts
Vanity Fair (magazine) people
Writers from Boston
Writers from New York City